Hornell Public Library is a historic library building located at Hornell in Steuben County, New York, USA. It was designed in 1908 and dedicated in 1911, with funds provided by the philanthropist Andrew Carnegie. It is one of 3,000 such libraries constructed between 1885 and 1919. Carnegie provided $25,000 toward the construction of the Hornell library. It is a one-story, five bay structure built of white pressed brick with masonry trim.

It was listed on the National Register of Historic Places in 1975.

References

External links
Hornell Public Library website

Library buildings completed in 1911
Libraries on the National Register of Historic Places in New York (state)
Neoclassical architecture in New York (state)
Carnegie libraries in New York (state)
Buildings and structures in Steuben County, New York
1911 establishments in New York (state)
National Register of Historic Places in Steuben County, New York
Hornell, New York